A high-voltage shore connection (HVSC) is an electrical connection between a ship and an electric grid, allowing the ship to shut off its engine and reduce fuel consumption and carbon emissions. 

The ship can use electric power for its consumption of energy. They are mostly used in the cruise ships which dock for longer time and hence save energy.

References

Electric power transmission